Khost Airport, also known as Khost International Airport, is located in the eastern section of Khost, which is the capital of Khost Province in Afghanistan. It is under the country's Ministry of Transport and Civil Aviation (MoTCA), and is used for domestic and international flights. The Ministry of Defense also uses it for emergency relief purposes such when the recent earthquake occurred in the area.

It provides air transportation to the entire Loya Paktia region.

Other nearby major airports to Khost are Kabul International Airport to the north, Nangarhar Airport to the northeast, Ghazni Airport to the east, and Ahmad Shah Baba International Airport in Kandahar to the southwest.

Airlines and destinations

History

During the 1980s Soviet–Afghan War, Khost airport was occupied by the invading Soviet Union forces. It was then occupied by Americans during the 2001-2021 U.S.-led war in Afghanistan. The United States built a military base there known as Forward Operating Base Chapman.

There had been three major reported accidents, all of them during the 1980s mujahideen fighting and involved Russian-made Antonov An-26 aircraft.

In December 2009, seven CIA employees were killed in a suicide attack at the nearby Forward Operating Base Chapman (FOB Chapman). The bomber, Humam Balawi of Jordan, wore a suicide vest and blew himself up in the base, killing the base commander, CIA agents and civilian contractors.

Work to improve and expand Khost Airport began in late 2011. Civilian passengers between Khost and Kabul were allowed to use NATO's Sehra Bagh Airport until Khost Airport was completed. It was announced that the airport will become international in the future, taking passengers to and from the United Arab Emirates.

The airport was officially inaugurated by Afghan President Ashraf Ghani on July 11, 2021, who was there to personally welcome passengers of a flight from Dubai.

In August 2021, security forces of the Islamic Emirate of Afghanistan (Taliban) took control of the airport from the NATO-trained Afghan National Security Forces (ANSF).

See also
List of airports in Afghanistan

References

External links
 
 , Feb. 18, 2021, Voice of America (VOA).
 User information
 User information
 Airport Records by Dr. Günther Eichhorn

Airports in Afghanistan
Khost Province
Afghanistan–Soviet Union relations